Gangcha Township (Mandarin: 岗察藏族乡) is a township in Xunhua Salar Autonomous County, Haidong, Qinghai, China. In 2010, Gangcha Township had a total population of 1,912: 999 males and 913 females: 505 aged under 14, 1,289 aged between 15 and 65 and 118 aged over 65.

References 
 

Township-level divisions of Qinghai
Haidong
Ethnic townships of the People's Republic of China